Earl Lee (born 9 December 1983) is a Korean-Canadian  conductor and cellist.

Early education 
Lee was born in Yeosu, South Korea,.  He started piano at the age of 5, and started cello at aged 9.  His entire family immigrated to Vancouver, Canada in 1995, then settled into Toronto in 1999.  Lee began his career as a cellist in the Toronto Symphony Youth Orchestra.  He was accepted into the Curtis Institute of Music at the age of 16; he studied cello with Orlando Cole and Peter Wiley. 

Earl Lee was diagnosed with focal dystonia when he was 24. He was proactive in finding a solution for his condition; he flew to South Korea to seek a top acupuncture specialist, but did not garner results. He sought out Spanish experts in the condition, but the recovery was very slow and unpredictable.  Initially devastated, he turned to conducting as a music outlet.

Continued Education and Career 

After graduating The Curtis Institute of Music in 2005, Earl Lee received his master's degree in cello performance from the Juilliard School, where he studied with David Soyer.  When he began transitioning into conducting, he studied with Ignat Solzhenitsyn in 2010. Lee received his Masters in Conducting from the Manhattan School of Music in 2013 under the tutelage of George Manahan. His post-graduate conducting studies were done with Hugh Wolff at the New England Conservatory of Music.

Toronto Symphony Orchestra
Earl Lee was the RBC Resident Conductor for the Toronto Symphony Orchestra between 2015 and 2018.

Pittsburgh Symphony
Earl Lee is currently the Associate Conductor of the Pittsburgh Symphony Orchestra.

Boston Symphony Orchestra 
Earl lee was named Assistant Conductor of the Boston Symphony Orchestra in August 2021.

Awards and recognition 
In 2018, Earl Lee was awarded the 50th Anniversary Heinz Unger Award from the Ontario Arts Council, recognizing him as one of Canada's most promising emerging conductor. He received the Felix Mendelssohn Bartholdy Scholarship in 2013, chosen by conductor Kurt Masur; this meant he was invited to travel to Leipzig to study the music and life of Felix Mendelssohn. In 2013, he also received the Ansbacher Fellowship by the American Austrian Foundation  and members of the Vienna Philharmonic; this recognition meant spending six weeks at the Salzburg Festival.

External links 
 Earl Lee Official Website
 Pittsburgh Symphony profile

References 

1983 births
Living people
People from Yeosu
Curtis Institute of Music alumni
Male conductors (music)
Juilliard School alumni
South Korean conductors (music)
Musicians from Toronto
21st-century Canadian conductors (music)
21st-century American musicians
Cellists
21st-century Canadian male musicians
21st-century cellists